Pioneer Valley High School (PVHS) is a public comprehensive high school in Santa Maria, California, United States. The school is the newest campus in the Santa Maria Joint Union High School District, opening to a class of freshmen and sophomores on August 11, 2004.

Academics
Pioneer Valley High School offers two foreign languages for study: French and Spanish.

The school achieved an API of 693 in 2009.

Athletics
Pioneer Valley High School sports teams are nicknamed the Panthers. Since 2018, the school has competed in the Central Coast Athletic Association, which is affiliated with the CIF Central Section. Prior to that, PVHS was a member of the CIF Southern Section (CIF-SS) and the Pac-8 League.

Notable alumni
Alfonso "A-Money" Romero aka AJ Bishop (American Rapper)
Ramiro (Ray) "Sonic" Medrano Martinez aka M.R.M aka King MED (American Rapper, Writer & Director)

References

External links

Educational institutions established in 2004
High schools in Santa Barbara County, California
Santa Maria, California
Public high schools in California
2004 establishments in California